Maudo Lamine Jarjué (born Modou Lamin Jarju on 30 September 1997) is a Gambian professional footballer who plays as a centre back for Slovak club ŠK Slovan Bratislava, on loan from IF Elfsborg and the Gambia national team. Nicknamed Chucka or Chuka, he also holds Bissau-Guinean citizenship through his grandmother.

Career
On 6 August 2016, Jarjué made his professional debut with Gil Vicente in a 2016–17 LigaPro match against Varzim.

On 9 July 2017, Jarjué signed a two-year contract with Azerbaijan Premier League side Səbail FK.

On 18 June 2019, Jarjué signed a contract with Austrian Football Bundesliga side Austria Wien.

On 2 November 2021, IF Elfsborg exercised the purchase option in their loan contract and signed a 3-year contract with Jarjué.

International career
On 2 October 2020, Jarjué was called up by the Gambia.

Career statistics

Club

References

External links
Stats and profile at LPFP 

1997 births
Living people
People from Serekunda
Gambian footballers
Association football defenders
Gambia Ports Authority FC players
Wallidan FC players
Gil Vicente F.C. players
Sabail FK players
FK Austria Wien players
IF Elfsborg players
ŠK Slovan Bratislava players
Liga Portugal 2 players
Azerbaijan Premier League players
Austrian Football Bundesliga players
Allsvenskan players
The Gambia international footballers
Gambian expatriate footballers
Gambian expatriate sportspeople in Portugal
Expatriate footballers in Portugal
Gambian expatriate sportspeople in Azerbaijan
Expatriate footballers in Azerbaijan
Gambian expatriate sportspeople in Austria
Expatriate footballers in Austria
Gambian expatriate sportspeople in Sweden
Expatriate footballers in Sweden
Gambian expatriate sportspeople in Slovakia
Expatriate footballers in Slovakia
Gambian people of Bissau-Guinean descent